Groove Master is an album by saxophonist Hank Crawford recorded in 1990 and released on the Milestone label.

Reception 

Allmusic's Scott Yanow stated: "Hank Crawford always puts a lot of passion into each note he plays. On this set of blues and soulful ballads, Crawford caresses each melody as usual but the lack of tempo variations and the generally so-so material keep this from being one of his more essential recordings. ... Although a pleasant enough listen, Hank Crawford has recorded many more significant dates than Groove Master".

Track listing
 "Grown and Gone" (Hank Crawford) – 5:11
 "There Is a Way" (Gloria Coleman) – 4:11
 "Blues for the Red Boy" (Todd Rhodes) – 7:06
 "Saving All My Love for You" (Michael Masser, Gerry Goffin) – 4:22
 "Bluebird" (Charlie Parker) – 6:01
 "A Toast to Lovers" (Danny Overbea) – 6:05
 "Holy Moly" (Melvin Sparks) – 5:42
 "Canadian Sunset" (Eddie Heywood, Norman Gimbel) – 5:32

Personnel
Hank Crawford  – alto saxophone, electric piano, arranger, conductor
Alan Rubin, Lew Soloff – trumpet
Lou Marini – tenor saxophone
Howard Johnson – baritone saxophone
Gloria Coleman – organ
Dr. John – piano
Melvin Sparks – guitar
Wilbur Bascomb - bass
Bernard Purdie − drums, percussion

References

Milestone Records albums
Hank Crawford albums
1990 albums
Albums produced by Bob Porter (record producer)